The Waldo Family Lecture Series on International Relations is a lecture series established in 1985 which takes place at Old Dominion University in Norfolk, Virginia. The university's first endowed lecture series was endowed by the Waldo family to honor the memories of Loren Pierce Waldo, Jr., William Joseph Waldo, Robert Hendren Waldo, Susan Waldo O'Hara, Julia Ann Waldo Campbell, and Harry Creekmur Waldo. International Relations was chosen as the topic for the lecture series due to the University's proximity to the International Port of Hampton Roads and the presence in Norfolk of the world's largest naval installation. Guest speakers for the lectures have come from such diverse fields as government, public service, foreign affairs, and journalism. Lectures have had such themes as "The Future of the West in a Changing World," "Human Rights in the 21st Century" and "America in the World - All Tactics, No Strategy," and have discussed such issues as the shortage of doctors in third-world countries, the 2008 financial crisis, and the diminishing role of Congress in the United States.

Past speakers
George S. McGovern (1987), Senator, U.S. Presidential Candidate (1972)
John B. Anderson (1988), U.S. Presidential Candidate (Independent Party, 1980), Congressman, Executive Director of Council for National Interest
Seymour M. Hersh (1989), Investigative Journalist, Pulitzer Prize Winner, Political Writer
Thomas R. Pickering (1991), Ambassador to the United Nations, Under Secretary of State for Political Affairs
James R. Schlesinger (1994), Secretary of Defense, Secretary of Energy
Mary Robinson (2006), President of Ireland, United Nations High Commissioner for Human Rights
John Warner (2008), U.S. Senator, Chair of Senate Armed Services Committee
Zbigniew Brzezinski (2009), National Security Adviser (1977-1981), Bush National Security Advisory Task Force
Frederick Kempe (2010), President of Atlantic Council
R. Nicholas Burns (2013), Ambassador, Under Secretary of State for Political Affairs
Colonel Jack H. Jacobs, U.S. Army, retired (2018), Medal of Honor recipient, military analyst for NBC and MSNBC, Vice-Chairman of Medal of Honor Foundation, U.S. Military Academy McDermott Chair of Politics.

References

Old Dominion University